Robert Storrie Guthrie (17 November 1857 – 20 January 1921) was a Scottish-born Australian politician. He was educated at Glasgow before becoming a seaman and migrating to Australia in 1887. He was South Australian Secretary and Federal President of the Seamen's Union before entering the South Australian Legislative Council as a Labor member in 1891. In 1903, he left the Council to contest the Australian Senate, in which he was successful. Originally an Australian Labor Party Senator, he left the party in the wake of the 1916 split over conscription, joining the Nationalist Party.

On 19 January 1921, Guthrie was struck by a tram as he crossed the road at the corner of Collins and Swanston Streets in Melbourne. He was taken to the Royal Melbourne Hospital, where he died the next day from head injuries. Nationalist Edward Vardon was appointed to replace him.

References

1857 births
1921 deaths
Australian Labor Party members of the Parliament of Australia
Nationalist Party of Australia members of the Parliament of Australia
Members of the Australian Senate for South Australia
Members of the Australian Senate
Members of the South Australian Legislative Council
National Labor Party members of the Parliament of Australia
Scottish emigrants to colonial Australia
Road incident deaths in Victoria (Australia)
20th-century Australian politicians